Pakhal is an area of the Mansehra district in Khyber Pakhtunkhwa, Pakistan. It was ruled by the Sarkar Sultanate between 1190 and 1519. Also known as the Sarkar Kingdom, it was known for agricultural products such as rice and tobacco. The territory used to extend from Jalalabad, Afghanistan, to Kashmir.

It is named for the Sultan Sarkar Jahangir of the Swati tribe, who was later succeeded by his brother, Sultan Bahram. The Swati, after the fall of their kingdom in the Swat and Dir Districts, crossed the Indus River to take control of Sarkar and adjoining areas from the Karluk Turks.

Sultans
Sultans of the Gabari Kingdom included:
Sultan Mehmood Khurd 
 Sultan Pakhal Sarkar
 Sultan Bahram
 Sultanate Dussehra 
 Sultan Arghush
 Sultan Jahangir 
 Sultan Awais Swati
 Sultan Was Anna Toman

References

 Populated places in Mansehra District